Meherbanu Khanam (1885 – 3 October 1925) was a Bengali artist and noblewoman. She was the daughter of Nawab Ahsanullah Khwaja and his wife Nawab Begum Kamrunnesa.

Early life
Khanam was born on 1885 in Ahsan Manzil, Dhaka, Bengal Presidency, British Raj to the Dhaka Nawab family. Her father was the Nawab of Dhaka Khwaja Ahsanullah and her brother was Nawab Khwaja Salimullah was the next Nawab of Dhaka. She was home schooled like most nobility in Bengal. In 1902 she was married to Khwaja Mohammad Azam.

Career
Khanam send her paintings to The Moslem Bharat, a monthly magazine, where it was seen by Kazi Nazrul Islam, the future national poet of Bangladesh. Kazi Nazrul Islam being inspired by the painting wrote a poem, Kheyaparer Tarani. The paintings was published by the magazine along with the poem in the July–August 1920 edition. It was the first time a painting of a Bengali woman was published. Khanam opened Kamrunnessa Girls' High School in Dhaka with her sisters Akhtarbanu and Paribanu. The school was named after her mother. She patronized Jadu, a monthly Urdu magazine.

Death
Khanam died on 3 October 1925 in Dhaka, East Bengal, British Raj.

References

1885 births
1925 deaths
Bangladeshi feminists
Artists from Dhaka
Bengali women artists
Members of the Dhaka Nawab family
Bangladeshi women artists
20th-century Indian women artists